Batman Begins is a 2005 superhero film directed by Christopher Nolan and written by Nolan and David S. Goyer. The film is based on the DC Comics character Batman, it stars Christian Bale as Bruce Wayne / Batman, with Michael Caine, Liam Neeson, Katie Holmes, Gary Oldman, Cillian Murphy, Tom Wilkinson, Rutger Hauer, Ken Watanabe, and Morgan Freeman in supporting roles. The film reboots the Batman film series, telling the origin story of Bruce Wayne from the death of his parents to his journey to become Batman and his fight to stop Ra's al Ghul and the Scarecrow from plunging Gotham City into chaos.

After Batman & Robin was panned by critics and underperformed at the box office, Warner Bros. Pictures cancelled future Batman films, including Joel Schumacher's planned Batman Unchained. Between 1998 and 2003, several filmmakers collaborated with Warner Bros. in attempting to reboot the franchise. After the studio rejected a Batman origin story reboot Joss Whedon pitched in December 2002, Warner Bros. hired Nolan in January 2003 to direct a new film as Nolan and Goyer began development on the film in early 2003. Aiming for a darker, more realistic tone compared to the previous films, a primary goal for their vision was to engage the audience's emotional investment in both the Batman and Bruce Wayne identities of the lead character. The film, which was principally shot in the United Kingdom, Iceland and Chicago, relied heavily on traditional stunts and miniature effects, with computer-generated imagery being used in a minimal capacity compared to other action films. Comic book storylines such as The Man Who Falls, Batman: Year One and Batman: The Long Halloween served as inspiration.

Expectations for Batman Begins ranged from moderate to low, which originated from the poor reception of Batman & Robin that was credited with stalling the Batman film series in 1997. After premiering in Tokyo on May 31, 2005, the film was released on June 15, 2005. It received highly positive reviews from critics, who deemed the film an improvement over the Schumacher films, with praise aimed at the more mature tone and character-driven storyline, Bale's performance, musical score, direction, the deeper psychological focus and added layers of depth to the titular character's motives and the emotional weight compared to previous Batman films. The film grossed over $371.9 million worldwide, becoming the ninth-highest-grossing film of 2005 and was the second highest grossing Batman film at the time behind Tim Burton's Batman (1989). Receiving a nomination for the Academy Award for Best Cinematography, the film elevated Bale to leading man status while it made Nolan a high-profile director.

Since its release, Batman Begins has often been cited as one of the most influential films of the 2000s. It was credited for revitalizing the Batman character in popular culture, shifting its tone towards a darker and more serious tone and style. The film helped popularise the term reboot in Hollywood, inspiring studios and filmmakers to revive franchises with realistic and serious tones. It was followed by The Dark Knight (2008) and The Dark Knight Rises (2012), with the three films constituting The Dark Knight Trilogy.

Plot

In Gotham City, a young Bruce Wayne falls down a dry well and is attacked by a swarm of bats, developing a fear of them. Attending the opera with his parents, Thomas and Martha, Bruce becomes frightened by performers masquerading as bats and asks to leave. Outside, mugger Joe Chill murders Bruce's parents in front of him, and the orphaned Bruce is raised by the family butler, Alfred Pennyworth. 

Fourteen years later, Chill is paroled after testifying against mafia boss Carmine Falcone. Bruce intends to murder Chill to avenge his parents, but one of Falcone's assassins does so first. Bruce's childhood friend Rachel Dawes berates him for acting outside the justice system. After confronting Falcone, who tells him that real power comes from being feared, Bruce spends the next seven years traveling the world training in combat and immersing himself in the criminal underworld.

In a Bhutan prison, he meets Henri Ducard, who recruits him to the League of Shadows led by Ra's al Ghul. After completing his training, Bruce learns that the League knows about Gotham and, believing the city is beyond saving, intends to destroy it. Bruce rejects the League and its mandate that killing is necessary, burning down their temple during his escape. Ra's is killed by falling debris, while Bruce saves the unconscious Ducard. Intent on fighting crime, Bruce returns to Gotham and takes an interest in his family's company, Wayne Enterprises, which is being taken public by the unscrupulous William Earle. Company archivist Lucius Fox, a friend of Bruce's father, allows Bruce access to prototype defense technologies, including a protective bodysuit and a heavily armored vehicle called a Tumbler. Bruce poses publicly as a shallow playboy, even to Rachel for a moment, while setting up a base in the caves beneath Wayne Manor and taking up the vigilante identity of "Batman," inspired by his childhood fear, which he has now conquered.

Intercepting a drug shipment, Batman provides Rachel, now a Gotham Assistant District Attorney, with evidence against Falcone and enlists Sergeant James Gordon, one of Gotham's few honest cops, to arrest him. In prison, Falcone meets Dr. Jonathan Crane, a corrupt psychologist whom he has helped smuggle drugs into Gotham. Donning a scarecrow mask, Crane sprays Falcone with a fear-inducing hallucinogen, which drives him insane and has him transferred to Arkham Asylum. While investigating his crimes, Batman is sprayed with the hallucinogen and set on fire by Crane but manages to escape and is saved by Alfred, who gives him an antidote for the hallucinogen developed by Fox. When Rachel accuses Crane of corruption, he reveals that he has introduced his drug into Gotham's water supply. Crane then drugs Rachel with the hallucinogen, but Batman subdues him and sprays Crane with his own chemical to interrogate him, where Crane claims to work for Ra's al Ghul.

Batman evades the police to get Rachel to safety, administering the antidote, and giving her two vials: one for Gordon and the other for mass production. At Bruce's birthday party, Ducard reappears and reveals himself to be the true Ra's al Ghul; the dead Ra's was a decoy. Having stolen a powerful microwave emitter from Wayne Enterprises, he plans to vaporize Gotham's water supply, rendering Crane's drug airborne and causing mass hysteria that will destroy the city. He sets Wayne Manor aflame and leaves Bruce to die, but Alfred rescues him. Ra's loads the emitter onto Gotham's monorail train to release the drug at the city's central water source. Batman rescues Rachel from a drugged mob and indirectly reveals his identity to her. Batman confronts Ra's on the train and disables its controls as Gordon uses the Tumbler's cannons to destroy a section of the track. Refusing to save Ra's again, Batman escapes the train and leaves him to die as it crashes.

Bruce gains Rachel's respect and love, but she decides she cannot be with him now, telling him they can be together if Gotham should no longer need Batman. Batman becomes a public hero, and Bruce reveals he has purchased a controlling stake in Wayne Enterprises, firing Earle and replacing him with Fox. Sergeant Gordon is promoted to Lieutenant, shows Batman the Bat-Signal, and tells him about a criminal who leaves behind Joker playing cards. Batman promises to look into it and disappears into the night.

Cast
 Christian Bale as Bruce Wayne / Batman:A billionaire socialite who, after witnessing his parents' death in a mugging at age 8, travels around the world seven years before returning home to inherit his family company Wayne Enterprises whilst operating at night as a bat-masked vigilante bringing justice upon the criminal underworld of Gotham City. Bale was relatively unknown when cast. Before he was confirmed on September 11, 2003, having expressed interest in the role since Darren Aronofsky was planning his own film adaptation, Eion Bailey, Henry Cavill, Billy Crudup, Hugh Dancy, Jake Gyllenhaal, Joshua Jackson, David Boreanaz, Heath Ledger, who later played the Joker in The Dark Knight, and Cillian Murphy, who would later be cast as Dr. Jonathan Crane / Scarecrow, took interest in it as well. Josh Hartnett met with Nolan about the role, but decided against pursuing it. Bale, Bailey and Murphy auditioned using the Batman Forever sonar suit donated by Val Kilmer, but the cape was lost, and Amy Adams served as the casting reader for the casting of Bruce Wayne / Batman in a favor to the casting director. Bale felt the previous films underused Batman's character, overplaying the villains instead. To best pose as Batman, Bale studied graphic novels and illustrations of the superhero. Director Nolan said of Bale, "He has exactly the balance of darkness and light that we were looking for." Goyer stated that while some actors could play a great Bruce Wayne or a great Batman, Bale could portray both radically different personalities. Since he had lost a great deal of weight in preparation for his role in The Machinist, Bale hired a personal trainer to help him gain  of muscle in the span of only a couple of months to help him physically prepare for the role. Bale trained in Wing Chun Kung Fu under Eric Oram in preparation for the movie.
Gus Lewis as Young Bruce Wayne.
 Michael Caine as Alfred Pennyworth:A trusted butler to Bruce's parents, who continues his loyal service to their son after their deaths as his closest confidant. Nolan offered the role to Anthony Hopkins but he declined. Nolan went to Caine's country home to personally deliver him the script, telling what his role would be and describing Alfred as "Batman's godfather". Nolan felt Caine would effectively portray the foster father element of the character. Although Alfred is depicted in the film as having served the Wayne family for generations, Caine created his own backstory, in that before becoming Wayne's butler, Alfred served in the Special Air Service. After being wounded, he was invited to the position of the Wayne family butler by Thomas Wayne because, "He wanted a butler, but someone a bit tougher than that, you know?"
 Liam Neeson as Henri Ducard / Ra's al Ghul: The leader of the League of Shadows, an ancient society that uses chaos to punish the corrupt and decadent, who goes undercover as an associate of the League and trains Bruce in martial arts, later revealing himself in the film's climax. Writer David Goyer said he felt he was the most complex of all the Batman villains, comparing him to Osama bin Laden; "He's not crazy in the way that all the other Batman villains are. He's not bent on revenge; he's actually trying to heal the world. He's just doing it by very draconian means." Gary Oldman was first choice for the part, but ended up playing James Gordon instead. Guy Pearce, who collaborated with Christopher Nolan on Memento (2000), reported that the pair had discussions about him playing the role, but both of them decided that he was too young for the part. Viggo Mortensen was also considered for the role. Neeson is commonly cast as a mentor, so the revelation that his character was the main villain was intended to shock viewers.
 Katie Holmes as Rachel Dawes: Bruce's childhood friend and love interest who serves as Gotham City's assistant district attorney and fights against corruption in the city. Nolan found a "tremendous warmth and great emotional appeal" in Holmes, and also felt "she has a maturity beyond her years that comes across in the film and is essential to the idea that Rachel is something of a moral conscience for Bruce". 
 Emma Lockhart as Young Rachel Dawes.
 Gary Oldman as James Gordon:One of the few uncorrupted Gotham City police officers, who is on duty the night of the murder of Bruce's parents and, in this way, shares a special bond with the adult Bruce and thus with Batman. Oldman was Nolan's first choice for Ra's al Ghul, but when Chris Cooper turned down the part of Gordon to spend time with his family Nolan decided that it would be refreshing for Oldman, who is renowned for his portrayals of villains, to play the role instead. "I embody the themes of the movie which are the values of family, courage and compassion and a sense of right and wrong, good and bad and justice," Oldman said of his character. He filmed most of his scenes in Britain. Goyer said Oldman heavily resembled Gordon as drawn by David Mazzucchelli in Batman: Year One.
 Cillian Murphy as Dr. Jonathan Crane / Scarecrow: A corrupt psychopharmacologist working as Chief Administrator of Arkham Asylum. A specialist in the psychology of fear, he has secretly created a fear-inducing toxin and plots with Ra's al Ghul to expose the entire Gotham population. Nolan decided against casting an Irish actor like Murphy for Batman, before casting him as Scarecrow. Murphy read numerous comics featuring the Scarecrow and discussed making the character look less theatrical with Nolan. Murphy explained, "I wanted to avoid the Worzel Gummidge look, because he's not a very physically imposing man – he's more interested in the manipulation of the mind and what that can do."
 Tom Wilkinson as Carmine "The Roman" Falcone:The most powerful Mafia boss in Gotham, who shares a prison cell with Joe Chill after he murdered Bruce's parents. Later, after having Chill murdered for his decision to testify against their relationship, he goes into business with Dr. Jonathan Crane and Ra's al Ghul by smuggling in Crane's fear toxins through his drug shipments over the course of several months so that they can be mixed in with the city's water supply.
 Rutger Hauer as William Earle:The CEO of Wayne Enterprises, who takes the company public in Bruce's long-term absence.
 Ken Watanabe as decoy Ra's al Ghul:A member of the League of Shadows assigned to impersonate Ra's al Ghul during Bruce's training.
 Morgan Freeman as Lucius Fox:A high-ranking Wayne Enterprises employee demoted to working in the company's Applied Science Division, where he conducts advanced studies in biochemistry and mechanical engineering and supplies Bruce with much of the gear necessary to carry out Batman's mission. He is promoted to CEO when Bruce takes control of the company by the end of the film.
Other cast members include Mark Boone Junior as Arnold Flass, Gordon's corrupt partner; Linus Roache as Thomas Wayne, Bruce's late father; Larry Holden as district attorney Carl Finch; Colin McFarlane as Gillian B. Loeb, the police commissioner; Christine Adams as Jessica, William Earle's secretary; Vincent Wong as an old Asian prisoner; Sara Stewart as Martha Wayne, Bruce's late mother; Richard Brake as Joe Chill, the Waynes' killer; Gerard Murphy as the corrupt High Court Judge Faden; Charles Edwards as a Wayne Enterprises executive; Tim Booth as Victor Zsasz; Rade Šerbedžija as a homeless man, who is the last person to meet Bruce when he leaves Gotham, and the first civilian to see Batman, Risteárd Cooper and Andrew Pleavin as uniformed policemen, Jo Martin as a police prison official, and Shane Rimmer and Jeremy Theobald (the star and co-producer of Nolan's 1998 film Following) as Gotham Water Board technicians. Jack Gleeson, who had previously co-starred with Bale in 2002's Reign of Fire and later found fame for his role as Joffrey Baratheon in the HBO series Game of Thrones, appears as a young admirer of Batman who is later saved by him from Ra's al Ghul's men; Gleeson was cast at Bale's recommendation. Actors John Foo, Joey Ansah, Spencer Wilding, Dave Legeno, Khan Bonfils, Mark Strange, Grant Guirey, Rodney Ryan and Dean Alexandrou portray members of the League of Shadows. Hayden Nickel made his acting debut portraying James Gordon Jr.

Production

Development

In January 2003, Warner Bros. hired Memento director Christopher Nolan to direct an untitled Batman film, and David S. Goyer signed on to write the script two months later. Nolan stated his intention to reinvent the film franchise of Batman by "doing the origins story of the character, which is a story that's never been told before". Nolan said that humanity and realism would be the basis of the origin film, and that "the world of Batman is that of grounded reality. [It] will be a recognizable, contemporary reality against which an extraordinary heroic figure arises." Goyer said that the goal of the film was to get the audience to care for both Batman and Bruce Wayne. Nolan felt the previous films were exercises in style rather than drama, and described his inspiration as being Richard Donner's 1978 film Superman, in its focus on depicting the character's growth. Also similar to Superman, Nolan wanted an all-star supporting cast for Batman Begins to lend a more epic feel and credibility to the story.

Goyer wanted to reboot the franchise; he and Nolan saw Batman as a romantic character, and Nolan envisioned a large, sweeping film like Lawrence of Arabia. Nolan did not have a problem with the studio's requirement that the film not be R-rated because he wanted to make the film that he wanted to see when 11 years old. His personal "jumping off point" of inspiration was "The Man Who Falls", a short story by Denny O'Neil and Dick Giordano about Bruce's travels throughout the world. The early scene in Batman Begins of young Bruce Wayne falling into a well was adapted from "The Man Who Falls". Batman: The Long Halloween, written by Jeph Loeb and drawn by Tim Sale, influenced Goyer in writing the screenplay, with the villain Carmine Falcone as one of many elements which were drawn from Halloweens "sober, serious approach". The writers considered having Harvey Dent in the film, but replaced him with the new character Rachel Dawes when they realized they "couldn't do him justice". The character was later portrayed by Aaron Eckhart in the 2008 sequel The Dark Knight. The sequel to Halloween, Batman: Dark Victory, also served as a minor influence. Goyer used the vacancy of Bruce Wayne's multi-year absence presented in Batman: Year One to help set up some of the film's events in the transpiring years. In addition, the film's Sergeant James Gordon was based on his comic book incarnation as seen in Year One. The writers of Batman Begins also used Frank Miller's Year One plot device, which was about a corrupt police force that led to Gordon and Gotham City's need for Batman. Due to Batman's extensive rogues gallery over seventy years, Goyer and Nolan decided to use the Scarecrow and Ra's al Ghul as the film's villains, as both characters had not been featured in previous Batman films nor in Adam West's 1960s television series.

A common idea in the comics is that Bruce saw a Zorro film with his parents before they were murdered. Nolan explained that by ignoring that idea – which he stated is not found in Batman's first appearances – it emphasized the importance of bats to Bruce and that becoming a superhero is a wholly original idea on his part. It is for this reason Nolan believes other DC characters do not exist in the universe of his film; otherwise, Wayne's reasons for taking up costumed vigilantism would have been very different.

Filming
As with all his films, Nolan refused a second unit; he did this in order to keep his vision consistent. Filming began in March 2004 in the Vatnajökull glacier in Iceland (standing in for Bhutan). The crew built a village and the front doors to Ra's' temple, as well as a road to access the remote area. The weather was problematic, with  winds, rain, and a lack of snow. A shot that cinematographer Wally Pfister had planned to take using a crane had to be completed with a handheld camera.

Unlike Burton and Schumacher's Gotham City that did not exist in the real world, Nolan shot exteriors in London, New York, and Chicago as he wanted the city to seem recognizable. In seeking inspiration from Superman and other blockbuster films of the late 1970s and early 1980s, Nolan based most of the production in England, specifically Shepperton Studios. An airship hangar at Cardington, Bedfordshire was rented by Warner Bros. during April 2004 and, converted into a  sound stage, was where the slum-district of "the Narrows" and the feet of the monorails were filmed.

Mentmore Towers was chosen from twenty different locations for Wayne Manor, as Nolan and Crowley liked its white floors, which gave the impression of the manor as a memorial to Wayne's parents. The building chosen to represent Arkham Asylum was the National Institute for Medical Research building in Mill Hill, northwest London, England. The St Pancras railway station and the Abbey Mills Pumping Stations were used for Arkham's interiors. The Senate House of University College London was used for courtrooms. Some scenes, including the Tumbler pursuit, were filmed in Chicago at locations such as Lower Wacker Drive and 35 East Wacker. Authorities agreed to raise Franklin Street Bridge for a scene where access to the Narrows is closed.

Despite the film's darkness, Nolan wanted to make the film appeal to a wide age range. "Not the youngest kids obviously, I think what we've done is probably a bit intense for them but I certainly didn't want to exclude the sort of ten to 12-year olds, because as a kid I would have loved to have seen a movie like this." Because of this, nothing gory or bloody was filmed.

Music

The score for Batman Begins was composed by Hans Zimmer and James Newton Howard. Nolan originally invited Zimmer to compose the music, and Zimmer asked Nolan if he could invite Howard to compose as well, as they had always planned a collaboration. The two composers collaborated on separate themes for the "split personality" of Bruce Wayne and his alter ego, Batman. Zimmer and Howard began composing in Los Angeles and moved to London where they stayed for twelve weeks to complete most of their writing. Zimmer and Howard sought inspiration for shaping the score by visiting the Batman Begins sets.

Zimmer wanted to avoid writing music that had been done in earlier Batman films, so the score became an amalgamation of orchestra and electronic music. The film's ninety-piece orchestra was developed from members of various London orchestras, and Zimmer chose to use more than the normal number of cellos. Zimmer enlisted a boy soprano to help reflect the music in some of the film's scenes where tragic memories of Bruce Wayne's parents are involved. "He's singing a fairly pretty tune and then he gets stuck, it's like froze, arrested development," said Zimmer. He also attempted to add a human dimension to Batman, whose behavior would typically be seen as "psychotic", through the music. Both composers collaborated to create 2 hours and 20 minutes worth of music for the film, with Zimmer composing the action sequences and Howard focusing on the dramatic scenes.

Special effects and design

Design
Nolan used the 1982 science fiction film Blade Runner as a source of inspiration for Batman Begins. He screened Blade Runner to Pfister and two others to show the attitude and style that he wanted to draw from the film. Nolan described the film's world as "an interesting lesson on the technique of exploring and describing a credible universe that doesn't appear to have any boundaries", a lesson that he applied to the production of Batman Begins.

Nolan worked with production designer Nathan Crowley to create the look of Gotham City. Crowley built a model of the city that filled Nolan's garage. Crowley and Nolan designed it as a large, modern metropolitan area that would reflect the various periods of architecture that the city had gone through. Elements were drawn from New York City, Chicago, and Tokyo; the latter for its elevated freeways and monorails. The Narrows was based on the slummish nature of the (now demolished) walled city of Kowloon in Hong Kong.

Tumbler

Crowley started the process of designing the Tumbler for the film by model bashing. Crowley used the nose cone of a P-38 Lightning model to serve as the chassis for the Tumbler's turbine engine. Six models of the Tumbler were built to 1:12 scale in the course of four months. Following the scale model creation, a crew of over 30 people, including Crowley and engineers Chris Culvert and Annie Smith, carved a full-size replica of the Tumbler out of a large block of Styrofoam in two months.

On the first jump test, the Tumbler's front end collapsed and had to be completely rebuilt. The basic configuration of the newly designed Tumbler included a 5.7-liter Chevy V8 engine, a truck axle for the rear axle, front tires by Hoosier (which are actually dirt racing tires used on the right rear of open wheel sprint cars), 4 rear 44/18.5-16.5 Interco Super Swamper TSL tires (44" tall, 18.5" wide, mounted on a 16.5" wheel) and the suspension system of Baja racing trucks. The design and development process took nine months and cost several million dollars.

With the design process complete, four street-ready race cars were constructed, with each vehicle possessing 65 panels and costing $250,000 to build. Two of the four cars were specialized versions. One version was the flap version, which had hydraulics and flaps to detail the close-up shots where the vehicle propelled itself through the air. The other version was the jet version, in which an actual jet engine was mounted onto the vehicle, fueled by six propane tanks. The visibility inside the vehicle was poor, so monitors were connected to cameras on the vehicle body. The professional drivers for the Tumblers practiced driving the vehicles for six months before they drove on the streets of Chicago for the film's scenes.

The interior of the Tumbler was an immobile studio set and not actually the interior of a street-capable Tumbler. The cockpit was oversized to fit cameras for scenes filmed in the Tumbler interior. In addition, another version of the Tumbler was a miniature model that was 1:6 scale of the actual Tumbler. This miniature model had an electric motor and was used to show the Tumbler flying across ravines and between buildings. However, the actual Tumbler was used for the waterfall sequence.

Batsuit

The filmmakers intended to create a very mobile Batsuit that would allow the wearer to move easily to fight and crouch. Previous film incarnations of the Batsuit had been stiff and especially restrictive of full head movement. Costume designer Lindy Hemming and her crew worked on the Batsuit at an FX workshop codenamed "Cape Town", a secured compound located at Shepperton Studios in London. The Batsuit's basic design was a neoprene undersuit, which was shaped by attaching molded cream latex sections. Christian Bale was molded and sculpted prior to his physical training so the team could work on a full body cast. To avoid imperfections picked up by sculpting with clay, plastiline was used to smooth the surface. In addition, the team brewed different mixtures of foam to find the mixture that would be the most flexible, light, durable, and black. The latter presented a problem, since the process to make the foam black reduced the foam's durability.

For the cape, director Christopher Nolan wanted to have a "flowing cloak... that blows and flows as in so many great graphic novels". Hemming's team created the cape out of their own version of parachute nylon that had electrostatic flocking, a process shared with the team by the British Ministry of Defence. The process was used by the London police force to minimize night vision detection. The cape was topped by a cowl, which was designed by Nolan, Hemming, and costume effects supervisor Graham Churchyard. The cowl was created to be thin enough to allow motion but thick enough to avoid wrinkling when Bale turned his head in the Batsuit. Churchyard explained the cowl had been designed to show "a man who has angst", so his character would be revealed through the mask.

Fight choreography
Fight choreographers for Batman Begins, Justo Dieguez and Andy Norman, trained actors and stunt performers using the Spanish Keysi Fighting Method, which itself gained fame after it was used in the film and its sequel, The Dark Knight; however, the method was modified in The Dark Knight Rises due to Batman's age and physical condition and in order to match Bale's fighting style. The method is a self-defense system whose training is based on the study and cultivation of natural instincts.

Visual effects
For Batman Begins, Nolan preferred traditional stuntwork over computer-generated imagery. Scale models were used to represent the Narrows and Ra's al Ghul's temple. There were, however, several establishing shots that were CG composite images, such as Gotham's skyline, exterior shots of Wayne Tower, and some of the exterior monorail shots. The climactic monorail sequence mixed live action footage, model work, and CGI. The bats depicted in the film were entirely digital (except in shots containing only one or two bats), as it was decided that directing large numbers of real bats on-set would be problematic; dead bats were scanned to create digital models. Locations and sets were recreated digitally so that the flying bats would not appear incongruous once incorporated into the finished film.

Release

Context 

2005 was expected by industry experts to underperform compared to 2004. Many attributed the slump to be a result of high ticket prices, marketing costs, DVD sales hitting record levels, and new technologies creating an incipient demand for movies delivered directly via the Internet, over-the-airwaves, satellite dish or cable set-top box. By the start of the theatrical summer in 2005 (May), the box office slumped for 11 consecutive weeks, with year-to-date ticket sales down 5.4 percent from last year even as ticket prices rose a moderate 3 percent, to around $6.40 on average, according to Exhibitor Relations. Theater attendance prior to the summer of 2005 declined about 8 percent.

Several films were projected to not only perform well at the box office, but also reverse the slump at the box office. Star Wars: Episode III - Revenge of the Sith was expected by the industry to be the top grossing film of the summer due to being the final live action Star Wars film at the time. Other films that were expected to do well were Batman Begins, Madagascar, Mr. & Mrs. Smith, Fantastic Four, War of the Worlds, and Charlie and the Chocolate Factory.

Batman Begins was expected by industry experts to help reverse the box office slump in June. However, there were concerns over a possible soft opening for the film. The previous film, Batman & Robin, was widely panned by critics and was credited with stalling the franchise since 1997. Bale's lack of star power at the time and a lack of iconic villains such as the Joker and Penguin that were portrayed by A-list celebrities were seen as possible detachments from audiences. Some also expressed concerns that Holmes' involvement with the film could derail the film's financial prospect due to her high-profile relationship with Tom Cruise (whose film War of the Worlds opened the following weekend) after his controversial appearance on The Oprah Winfrey Show.

Theatrical 
Warner Bros. held the world premiere for Batman Begins in Tokyo, Japan on May 31, 2005. The film opened on June 15, 2005, in the United States and Canada in 3,858 theaters, including 55 IMAX theaters.

Home media
The DVD of Batman Begins was released on October 18, 2005, in both single-disc and two-disc deluxe editions and also released on VHS and UMD Video formats. In addition to the film, the deluxe edition contained featurettes and other bonus materials. The edition contained a small paperback booklet, the first Batman story, featured in Detective Comics #27, as well as Batman: The Man Who Falls and an excerpt from Batman: The Long Halloween. Batman Begins achieved first place in national sales and rental charts in October 2005, becoming the top-selling DVD of the fourth quarter of 2005. The DVD grossed $11.36 million in rental revenue. The DVD held its position at the top of the sales chart for a second week, but fell to second place behind Bewitched on video rental charts. The film had brought in $167 million in DVD sales by August 2006.

Batman Begins was released on HD DVD on October 10, 2006. A Limited Edition Giftset of the film was released on DVD and Blu-ray on July 8, 2008, to coincide with The Dark Knight which hit theaters July 18, 2008. Due to the successful box office performance of The Dark Knight, the Batman Begins DVD saw an increase in both sales and rentals. Batman Begins was released on 4K UHD Blu-ray on December 19, 2017. It received a novelization written by Dennis O'Neil, and a comic book adaptation by Scott Beatty.

Reception

Box office
Batman Begins ranked at the top in its opening weekend, accumulating $48 million, which was seen as "strong but unimpressive by today's instantaneous blockbuster standards". The film's five-day gross was $72.9 million, beating Batman Forever (1995) as the franchise high. Batman Begins also broke the five-day opening record in the 55 IMAX theaters, grossing $3.16 million. Polled moviegoers rated the film with an A, and according to the studio's surveys, Batman Begins was considered the best of all the Batman films. The audience's demographic was 57 percent male and 54 percent people over the age of 25.

The film held its top spot for another weekend, accumulating $28 million in a 43 percent drop from its first weekend. Batman Begins went on to gross $205 million in North America and had a worldwide total of $371.8 million from its original release. It earned $1.6 million more from its 2012 re-release, bringing its lifetime worldwide total to $373.4 million. It is the fourth-highest-grossing Batman film, behind Tim Burton's Batman, which grossed $411 million worldwide and also being surpassed by its sequels The Dark Knight and The Dark Knight Rises, both of which have grossed over $1 billion. Batman Begins averaged $12,634 per theater in its opening weekend. It was released in more theaters, but sold fewer tickets than the other previous Batman movies, with the exception of Batman & Robin. Batman Begins was the seventh-highest-grossing film of 2005 in the US.

Critical response
The site's critical consensus reads, "Brooding and dark, but also exciting and smart, Batman Begins is a film that understands the essence of one of the definitive superheroes." At Metacritic, which assigns a weighted mean rating reviews, the film received an average score of 70 out of 100, based on 41 critics, which indicates "generally favorable reviews". Audiences polled by CinemaScore gave the film an average grade of "A" on an A+ to F scale.

James Berardinelli applauded Nolan and Goyer's work in creating more understanding into "who [Batman] is and what motivates him", something Berardinelli felt Tim Burton's film had lacked; at the same time, Berardinelli felt the romantic aspect between Bale and Holmes did not work because the actors lacked the chemistry Christopher Reeve and Margot Kidder (Superman), or Tobey Maguire and Kirsten Dunst (Spider-Man) shared in their respective roles. According to Total Film, Nolan manages to create such strong characters and story that the third-act action sequences cannot compare to "the frisson of two people talking", and Katie Holmes and Christian Bale's romantic subplot has a spark "refreshingly free of Peter Parker/Mary Jane-style whining".

Los Angeles Times Kenneth Turan, who felt the film began slowly, stated that the "story, psychology and reality, not special effects", assisted the darkness behind Batman's arsenal; he noted that Neeson and Holmes, unlike Bale's ability to "feel his role in his bones", do not appear to fit their respective characters in "being both comic-book archetypes and real people". The New Yorkers David Denby did not share Berardinelli and Turan's opinion. He was unimpressed with the film, when comparing it to the two Tim Burton films, and that Christian Bale's presence was hindered by the "dull earnestness of the screenplay", the final climax was "cheesy and unexciting", and that Nolan had resorted to imitating the "fakery" used by other filmmakers when filming action sequences.

Michael Wilmington of the Chicago Tribune believed Nolan and Goyer managed to "comfortably mix the tormented drama and revenge motifs with light hearted gags and comic book allusions," and that Nolan takes the series out of the "slam-bang Hollywood jokefests" the franchise had drifted into. Comic book scribe and editor Dennis O'Neil stated that he "felt the filmmakers really understood the character they were translating", citing this film as the best of the live-action Batman films. In contrast, J.R. Jones, from the Chicago Reader, criticized the script, and Nolan and David Goyer for not living up to the "hype about exploring Batman's damaged psyche". Roger Ebert, who gave mixed reviews to the previous films, and claimed in his review for Batman Returns that he did not believe noir worked in superhero films, wrote this was "the Batman movie I've been waiting for; more correctly, this is the movie I did not realize I was waiting for". Giving it four out of four stars, he commended the realistic portrayals of the Batman arsenal – the Batsuit, Batcave, Tumbler, and the Batsignal – as well as the focus on "the story and character" with less stress on "high-tech action".

Like Berardinelli, USA Todays Mike Clark thought Bale performed the role of Batman as well as he did Patrick Bateman in American Psycho, but that the relationship between Bruce Wayne and Rachel Dawes was "frustratingly underdeveloped". Kyle Smith thought Bale exhibited "both the menace and the wit he showed in his brilliant turn in American Psycho", and that the film works so well because of the realism, stating, "Batman starts stripping away each layer of Gotham crime only to discover a sicker and more monstrous evil beneath, his rancid city simultaneously invokes early '90s New York, when criminals frolicked to the tune of five murders a day; Serpico New York, when cops were for sale; and today, when psychos seek to kill us all at once rather than one by one." In contrast, Salon.com's Stephanie Zacharek felt Nolan did not deliver the emotional depth expected of "one of the most soulful and tortured superheroes of all"; she thought Bale, unlike Michael Keaton who she compared him to, failed to connect with the audience underneath the mask, but that Gary Oldman succeeded in "emotional complexity" where the rest of the movie failed.

Film director Tim Burton—who had directed the 1989 Batman film and its first sequel—felt Nolan "captured the real spirit that these kind of movies are supposed to have nowadays. When I did Batman twenty years ago, in 1988 or something, it was a different time in comic book movies. You couldn't go into that dark side of comics yet. The last couple of years that has become acceptable and Nolan certainly got more to the root of what the Batman comics are about."

Accolades

Impact
Batman Begins has been cited as one of the most influential films of the 2000s. On the film's 10th anniversary, Forbes published an article describing its lasting influence: "Reboot became part of our modern vocabulary, and superhero origin stories became increasingly envogue for the genre. The phrase "dark and gritty" likewise joined the cinematic lexicon, influencing our perception of different approaches to storytelling not only in the comic book film genre but in all sorts of other genres as well." Shawn Adler of MTV stated Batman Begins heralded a trend of darker genre films, that either retold back-stories or rebooted them altogether. Examples he cited were Casino Royale, as well as the in-development RoboCop, Red Sonja, and Grayskull. In 2012, Kevin Feige, film producer and president of Marvel Studios, stated, "Chris Nolan's Batman is the greatest thing that happened [to superhero films] because it bolstered everything." Filmmakers, screenwriters and producers who have mentioned Batman Begins or The Dark Knight Trilogy to describe their projects include:

 Jon Favreau (Iron Man)
 Edward Norton (The Incredible Hulk)
 McG (Terminator Salvation)
 Alan Taylor (Terminator Genisys)
 Damon Lindelof (Star Trek, Star Trek Into Darkness)
 Robert Downey, Jr. (Sherlock Holmes)
 Lorenzo di Bonaventura (G.I. Joe: The Rise of Cobra)
 Hugh Jackman (X-Men Origins: Wolverine)
 Matthew Vaughn (X-Men: First Class)
 Rupert Wyatt (Rise of the Planet of the Apes)
 Sam Mendes (Skyfall)
 Alex Kurtzman (Van Helsing)
 Gareth Edwards (Godzilla)
 Marc Webb (The Amazing Spider-Man)
 David Ayer (Suicide Squad)
 Bryan Cranston (Power Rangers)
 Adam Wingard (Death Note)
 Patty Jenkins and Matthew Jensen (Wonder Woman)
 James Mangold (Logan)
 Simon Kinberg (Dark Phoenix)
 Andrew Kosove (Blade Runner 2049)
 Todd Phillips (Joker)
 Cathy Yan (Birds of Prey)

Themes
Comic book writer and author Danny Fingeroth argues that a strong theme in the film is Bruce's search for a father figure, saying "[Alfred] is the good father that Bruce comes to depend on. Bruce's real father died before they could establish an adult relationship, and Liam Neeson's Ducard is stern and demanding, didactic and challenging, but not a father figure with any sympathy. If Bruce is anyone's son, he is Alfred's. [Morgan] Freeman's Lucius is cool and imperturbable, another steady anchor in Bruce's life." Blogger Mark Fisher states that Bruce's search for justice requires him to learn from a proper father figure, with Thomas Wayne and Ra's al Ghul being the two counterpoints. Alfred provides a maternal figure of unconditional love, despite the overall lack of focus on a mother figure in Bruce's life.

Fingeroth also argues that a major theme in the film is fear, which supports the story of Bruce Wayne becoming a hero. Director Christopher Nolan stated that the idea behind the film was "a person who would confront his innermost fear and then attempt to become it". Fingeroth referred to this film's depiction as "the man with fear—but who rises above it". The theme of fear is further personified by the Scarecrow. The film depicts how fear can affect all creatures regardless of might. Allusions to fear are seen throughout, from Bruce's conquering of his demons, to becoming Batman, to the Scarecrow and his deadly fear toxin. The macabre, distorted images presented in the Scarecrow's toxin-induced hallucinations also express the idea of terror to an extreme.

Critic Brian Orndorf considered Batman Begins "fierce" and "demonstrative in brood", giving the film an abundance of gravitas and energy. It strays away from the lighter fare of Joel Schumacher's 1997 Batman film, Batman & Robin, which contained camp one-liners throughout. The theme of fear is intensified with the help of the musical score by Zimmer and Howard, which also "eschews traditional heroic themes". Also contrary to previous Batman films, a psychological investigation of Bruce Wayne's split personality in the bat suit is only lightly touched upon. Orndorf noted that Bruce is a "character constantly striving to do the right thing, not worn down by incessant reexamination".

See also

 Vigilante film
 Neo-noir
 The Shadow – A 1994 superhero film based on the character that partially inspired Batman with a similar storyline of an American millionaire being trained in the East to fight crime
 List of films shot in Iceland

Notes

References

External links

  (Warner Bros.)
  (DC Comics)
 
 
 
 
 
 Batman Begins Production Notes, page 1 and pages 2–6. Warner Bros. via CinemaReview.com. Archived from the original  on September 9, 2015.
 Batman Begins on HBO Max

2005 action thriller films
2000s superhero films
2005 films
American action thriller films
American superhero films
British action thriller films
2000s crime action films
2000s English-language films
Films about chemical war and weapons
Films about fear
Films about terrorism
Films adapted into comics
Films directed by Christopher Nolan
Films produced by Charles Roven
Films produced by Emma Thomas
Films scored by Hans Zimmer
Films scored by James Newton Howard
Films set in 2005
Films set in Bhutan
Films set on fictional islands
Films set in psychiatric hospitals
Films shot at Shepperton Studios
Films shot in Chicago
Films shot in Iceland
Films shot in New York City
IMAX films
Legendary Pictures films
American neo-noir films
Reboot films
Films with screenplays by Christopher Nolan
Films with screenplays by David S. Goyer
Superhero thriller films
Syncopy Inc. films
1
Warner Bros. films
Films about police misconduct
Films about secret societies
Films about organized crime in the United States
Films set in prison
Films about corruption in the United States
American films about revenge
American vigilante films
2000s American films
2000s British films